Maurizio Nichetti (born 8 May 1948) is an Italian film screenwriter, actor and director. His 1989 film The Icicle Thief won the Golden St. George at the 16th Moscow International Film Festival. In 1998 he was a member of the jury at the 48th Berlin International Film Festival.

Filmography

Film Director
 1979 - Ratataplan
 1980 - Ho fatto splash
 1983 - Tomorrow We Dance (Domani si balla!)
 1986 - Il Bi e il Ba
 1989 - The Icicle Thief (Ladri di saponette)
 1991 - To Want to Fly (Volere volare)
 1993 - Stefano Quantestorie
 1995 - Snowball (Palla di neve)
 1996 - Luna e l'altra
 2001 - Honolulu Baby
 2008 - Dottor Clown

Actor
 1979 - Ratataplan
 1976 - Allegro non troppo
 1982 - Tomorrow We Dance (Domani si balla!)
 1983 - Hearts and Armour (I Paladini: Storia d'armi e d'amori)
 1984 - Bertoldo, Bertoldino e Cacasenno
 1989 - The Icicle Thief (Ladri di saponette)
 1991 - To Want to Fly (Volere volare)
 1993 - Stefano Quantestorie
 1994 - Seven Sundays (Tous les jours dimanche)
 1995 - Snowball (Palla di neve)
 1996 - Luna e l'altra
 2002 - Ciao America
 2010 - Somewhere

References

External links

 Official Site (Italian and English)

1948 births
Italian film directors
Italian screenwriters
Italian male screenwriters
Film people from Milan
Living people
David di Donatello winners
Nastro d'Argento winners
Male actors from Milan